The 1862 Vermont gubernatorial election for governor of Vermont was held on Tuesday, September 2. In keeping with the "Mountain Rule", incumbent Republican Frederick Holbrook was a candidate for a second one-year term. The Democratic nominee was Benjamin H. Smalley, who had been on the ballot in 1861 as the gubernatorial candidate of the "Peace Democrats," who favored compromise with the Confederacy.

Vermont continued to strongly support the Union and the Republican Party. Holbrook was backed by Republicans and pro-Union Democrats, and easily defeated Smalley to win a one-year term that began on October 10.

General election

Results

References

1862
Vermont
Gubernatorial
October 1862 events